St. George Forane Church, Edathua, also known as Edathua Pally is a parish of Syro-Malabar Catholic Church. Saint George is the patron saint of the church. It is one of the pilgrimage centre in Kerala located at Edathua on the bank of Pamba River in Alleppey District, Kerala. This church belongs to Archeparchy of Changanassery.

History
St. George Forane Church Edathua was constructed by a group of believers who severed ties with Champakulam diocese in 1810. It is located on the bank of river Pumba, about 15 km south east of Alappuzha. It is believed that, because of the saint's miraculous power, many devotees flowed to Edathua pally, especially during the saint's feast conducted from April 27 to May 7 of every year. Devotees in great numbers across the southern parts of the country visit the church during this feast.

The blessing received through the intercession of Saint George transformed Edathua into a permanent pilgrim center of South India.

See also
Roman Catholicism in India
Christianity in India

References

Churches in Kerala
Syro-Malabar Catholic church buildings
19th-century Roman Catholic church buildings in India